Ivor Mervyn Vigors Guest, 4th Viscount Wimborne (born 19 September 1968) is a British Grammy Award nominated record producer and Emmy Award nominated composer.

Career
He is best known for his work with Grace Jones (Hurricane / "Hurricane Dub", 2011) and Brigitte Fontaine (Prohibition, 2009 / "L'un n'empêche pas l'autre", 2011).

During his career, he has worked with Sly and Robbie, Tony Allen, Brigitte Fontaine, Areski Belkacem, Brian Eno, Grace Jones, Barry Reynolds, Atticus Ross, Tim Simenon, Robert Logan, Dave Okumu, Wally Badarou, Jessie Ware, Skye Edwards, Beyoncé and Lana Del Rey. He has also worked on tracks with French artists such as Jacques Higelin, M, Christophe, Bertrand Cantat, Arno, Alain Souchon, Philippe Katerine, and Emmanuelle Seigner with Brigitte Fontaine.

He received a Grammy nomination for his work on Beyoncé’s Renaissance album in 2022.

His film credits as composer include the Oscar-winning documentary Taxi to the Dark Side (Dir. Alex Gibney), Mea Maxima Culpa: Silence in the House of God (Dir. Alex Gibney), for which he was Emmy nominated, Citizen K (Dir. Alex Gibney), the Oscar short-listed Semper Fi- Always Faithful, Nick Love's film "Goodbye Charlie Bright", and the British cult movie The Football Factory, also a film by Nick Love. He generally works with Robert Logan on scores.

In November 2014, he produced and co-wrote the Grace Jones track "Original Beast", featured on the Lorde curated soundtrack album for The Hunger Games: Mockingjay – Part 1 movie.

He is the musical director of Grace Jones' live band and show, and of the live performance sequences in the Sophie Fiennes directed Bloodlight and Bami.

In the non-musical sphere he has an interest in ecology and habitat regeneration, and has been responsible for the planting of over 4 million trees in the UK, as well as encouraging responsible management practice in ecologically sensitive areas. He was an early adopter of Socially Responsible Investment practices. He has a long-term association with US artist James Turrell, and has constructed a Skyspace by the artist, as well as having one of Turrell's Space Division pieces named after him- 'Ivor Blue.'

He currently lives and works in the United Kingdom.

Family
He is the son of Ivor Guest, 3rd Viscount Wimborne, and married to Ieva Imsa. They have a daughter and a son.

Arms

References

External links
"The night I danced away with Grace Jones", Life is filled with diverting roads, 22 August 2009

1968 births
Living people
People educated at Eton College
Viscounts in the Peerage of the United Kingdom
Ivor Mervyn Vigors
British record producers
Wimborne